Pines is the third and final studio album by A Fine Frenzy, the stage name for American singer-songwriter Alison Sudol. The album was released in the United States on October 9, 2012 and in the United Kingdom on January 28, 2013 through Virgin Records. Pines is accompanied by a companion book and short animated film, 'The Story of Pines,' which premiered on TakePartTV on October 2.

To support the album, Sudol co-headlined the "Live and In Concert" tour throughout the United States and western Canada in October and November 2012 with musician Joshua Radin.

Composition
Pines contains thirteen original tracks, each written or co-written by Sudol, and totals 67 minutes, 47 seconds in length. In an interview with Anthropologie, Sudol stated that "the entire record is a story, and each song is a chapter that leads into the next."

Promotion

Singles
The song "Now Is the Start" was released as the lead single for "Pines" on July 30, 2012. Sudol performed the song live on The Tonight Show with Jay Leno on October 3, 2012. The accompanying music video was released on November 15, 2012.

Other songs
In addition, a music video for "Avalanches", a promotional single for "Pines", was released on October 9 to coincide with the album's release date. To date, lyric videos for both "Now Is The Start" and "Avalanches" have been posted to A Fine Frenzy's official YouTube account.

Critical response

Reviews for Pines have been generally positive. Maggie Levin of mxdwn.com praised the quality of Sudol's writing and commented that "aptly, there is as much forest as longing in this record," concluding that "the journey is as diverse as it is exquisite, with moments of  solemn austerity cleverly offset by felicitous rapture." Caitlin White of Spinner.com also gave the album a favorable review in her interview of Sudol, writing "Pines manages to combine the real world with the world of imagination in a very tangible way." Consequence of Sound awarded the album three out of five stars, asserting that Pines is "double-edged walk through the woods," and the album reflects "the sound of growing up." James Christopher Monger of AllMusic gave Pines four stars out of five, praising Sudol's successful integration of natural themes and emphasizing that "Sudol is a masterful architect of atmosphere" and her songs "all benefit from her ability to balance musicality with austerity, and like the rivers she draws much of her inspiration from, blissfully follow a course to the ocean of their own design." EY Magazine also awarded Pines four stars out of five, calling the album "authentic music" and remarking that "A Fine Frenzy releases the kind of music you’re not only compelled to listen but dared to feel in your soul."

Track listing

Track listing adapted from Allmusic.

Charts

Tour

Tour listing adapted from A Fine Frenzy's official live page.

Personnel

Alison Sudol – composer, percussion, piano, programming, vocals
Jon Brion - bass, guitar, instrumentation, keyboards, pump organ
Matt Chamberlain - drums, percussion
Omar Cowan - guitar, programming, vocals (background)
Keefus Green - keyboards, piano, producer, programming, pump organ, vibraphone
Gabe Noel - bass, bass (upright), bowed bass, cello
Martin Tillman - cello, electric cello
Peter Bradley Adams – piano
Jonathan Wilson - composer, drums, ukulele

Jesse Siebenberg - composer
Omar Velasco - composer
Paul Ackling - guitar technician
Ronette Bowie - A&R
Dan McCarroll - A&R
Eric Caudieux - engineer, Pro-Tools
Greg Koller - engineer, mixing
Hugo Nicholson - engineer
Paul Smith - second engineer
Patricia Sullivan Fourstar - mastering
Nicole Frantz - Creative director
Bob Semanovich - Product manager
Abby Weintraub - Design

Personnel adapted from Allmusic.

References

External links

 Pines at A Fine Frenzy's official site
 

2012 albums
A Fine Frenzy albums
Virgin Records albums